Evert Albert Alkema (18 January 1939 - 12 June 2022) was a Dutch jurist and professor of international law at University of Leiden who served on the European Commission of Human Rights from 1996 to 1999.

References

Further reading

Academic staff of Leiden University
Dutch jurists
International law scholars
Members of the European Commission of Human Rights
1939 births
2022 deaths